The Lithuanian Handball Federation (LHF) is the administrative and controlling body for handball and beach handball in Republic of Lithuania. Founded in 1991, LHF is a member of European Handball Federation (EHF) and the International Handball Federation (IHF).

National teams
 Lithuania men's national handball team
 Lithuania men's national junior handball team
 Lithuania women's national handball team

Competitions
 Lithuanian Handball League
 Lithuanian Women's Handball League

References

External links
 Official website  
 Lithuania at the IHF website.
 Lithuania at the EHF website.

Handball in Lithuania
Handball
Sports organizations established in 1991
1991 establishments in Lithuania
Handball governing bodies
European Handball Federation
National members of the International Handball Federation
Organizations based in Kaunas